The Eddy-Taylor House is a historic house in Lincoln, Nebraska. It was built with bricks in 1891 for Ambrose Eddy, and designed in the Queen Anne style. In 1902, it was purchased by Professor W. G. L. Taylor, who was the chair of the department of Political Economy at the University of Nebraska–Lincoln from 1893 to 1911. The house has been listed on the National Register of Historic Places since July 21, 1983.

References

National Register of Historic Places in Lincoln, Nebraska
Queen Anne architecture in Nebraska
Houses completed in 1891
1891 establishments in Nebraska